Mel Bourne (November 22, 1923 – January 14, 2003) was an American production designer and art director. He was nominated for three Academy Awards in the category Best Art Direction. He was born Melvin B. Bornstein in Chicago, Illinois, the son of Frieda and Max Bornstein.

Family
Bourne married actress Sarah Marshall June 13, 1952. They had one child, Timothy Bourne, and they divorced in 1957.

Selected filmography
Bourne was nominated for three Academy Awards for Best Art Direction:
 Interiors (1978)
 The Natural (1984)
 The Fisher King (1991)

References

External links

1923 births
2003 deaths
American art directors
Artists from Chicago
American production designers
Yale School of Drama alumni